In Thugz We Trust is the debut collaboration album by American rappers C-Bo and Yukmouth (together known as the supergroup Thug Lordz). The album was released March 30, 2004, on West Coast Mafia Records and Smoke-A-Lot Records. It peaked at number 63 on the Billboard Top R&B/Hip-Hop Albums and at number 47 on the Billboard Top Heatseekers. The album features guest performances by Silverback Guerillaz, Eastwood, Killa Tay and also Spice 1, who would later join the group on their second album, Thug Lordz Trilogy.

Track listing

Chart history

References

External links 
 In Thugz We Trust at Discogs
 In Thugz We Trust at MusicBrainz
 In Thugz We Trust at ProdBy

Thug Lordz albums
C-Bo albums
Yukmouth albums
2004 debut albums
Albums produced by Bosko